Alexander's trick, also known as the Alexander trick,  is a basic result in geometric topology, named after J. W. Alexander.

Statement
Two homeomorphisms of the n-dimensional ball  which agree on the boundary sphere  are isotopic.

More generally, two homeomorphisms of Dn that are isotopic on the boundary are isotopic.

Proof
Base case: every homeomorphism which fixes the boundary is isotopic to the identity relative to the boundary.

If  satisfies , then an isotopy connecting f to the identity is given by

 

Visually, the homeomorphism is 'straightened out' from the boundary, 'squeezing'  down to the origin. William Thurston calls this "combing all the tangles to one point". In the original 2-page paper, J. W. Alexander explains that for each  the transformation  replicates  at a different scale, on the disk of radius , thus as  it is reasonable to expect that  merges to the identity.

This underlines that the Alexander trick is a PL construction, but not smooth.

General case: isotopic on boundary implies isotopic

Radial extension
Some authors use the term Alexander trick for the statement that every homeomorphism of  can be extended to a homeomorphism of the entire ball .

However, this is much easier to prove than the result discussed above: it is called radial extension (or coning) and is also true piecewise-linearly, but not smoothly.

Concretely, let  be a homeomorphism, then
 defines a homeomorphism of the ball.

Exotic spheres
The failure of smooth radial extension and the success of PL radial extension
yield exotic spheres via twisted spheres.

See also
 Clutching construction

References

 

Geometric topology
Homeomorphisms